A Wollaston prism is an optical device, invented by William Hyde Wollaston, that manipulates polarized light. It separates light into two separate  linearly polarized outgoing beams with orthogonal polarization. The two beams will be polarized according to the optical axis of the two right angle prisms.

The Wollaston prism consists of two orthogonal prisms of birefringent material—typically a uniaxial material such as calcite. These prisms are cemented together on their base (traditionally with Canada balsam) to form two right triangle prisms with perpendicular optic axes. Outgoing light beams diverge from the prism as ordinary and extraordinary rays due to the differences in the indexes of refraction, with the angle of divergence determined by the prisms' wedge angle and the wavelength of the light. Commercial prisms are available with divergence angles from less than 1° to about 45°.

See also
Other types of polarizing prisms

References

Polarization (waves)
Prisms (optics)